"Fast Train" is the debut single by the Canadian rock band April Wine, from their 1971 self-titled debut. It was a top 40  hit in Canada, peaking at #38 on the RPM 100 Singles Chart. It also peaked at #23 on the Canadian CHUM singles chart, on June 26, 1971. The success of this single established Myles Goodwyn as the band's main songwriter, and made it possible for April Wine to record a second album.

"Fast Train" appears in the soundtrack for the thriller film Natural Enemy (1997), a film starring Donald Sutherland and William McNamara.

Chart positions

References

April Wine songs
1971 debut singles
Songs written by Myles Goodwyn
Songs about trains
Aquarius Records (Canada) singles
1971 songs